Mikhail Antonovich Dasko (born 26 January 1961) is a Russian former long-distance runner who competed for the Soviet Union and later Russia. He was a bronze medallist at both the European Athletics Indoor Championships in 1988 and the 1992 IAAF World Cup. He represented the Soviet Union at the 1988 Seoul Olympics.

Born in Zashchebye in the Gomel Region of the Belarusian SSR, he became prominent at national level in the mid-1980s with a 5000 m win at the Soviet Athletics Championships. He went on to win that title three more times, in a consecutive run from 1989 to 1991. He also did a national distance double with 10,000 metres titles in 1990 and 1991. Indoors, he won the 3000 metres in 1990 and a 3000/5000 m indoor double in 1991 (meaning he won all the distance indoor and outdoor Soviet track titles that year).

His first major medal (a 3000 m bronze) came at the 1988 European Athletics Indoor Championships. He represented the Soviet Union later that year at the Summer Olympics and was a semi-finalist. Further bronze medals followed at the 1989 European Cup then the 1990 Goodwill Games. He would later claim another bronze, over 10,000 m, at the 1992 IAAF World Cup.

Dasko competed four times at the IAAF World Cross Country Championships, twice for the Soviet Union and twice for Russia. His best finish was 32nd place at the 1991 edition. His two other global performances brought tenth in the 3000 m at the 1989 IAAF World Indoor Championships and an appearance in the first round of the 5000 m at the 1991 World Championships in Athletics.

He also competed internationally at the 1986 Goodwill Games, 1992 International Chiba Ekiden and the 1994 European Cross Country Championships.

Personal bests
3000 metres – 7:42.00 min (1989)
3000 metres indoors – 7:51.83 min (1989)
5000 metres – 13:16.73 min (1991)
5000 metres indoors – 13:46.12 min	 (1991)
10,000 metres – 28:37.37 min (1990)

All information from All-Athletics

International competitions

National titles
Soviet Athletics Championships
5000 m: 1986, 1989, 1990, 1991
10,000 m: 1990, 1991
Soviet Indoor Athletics Championships
3000 m: 1990, 1991
5000 m: 1991

See also
List of 5000 metres national champions (men)

References

External links

1961 births
Living people
Sportspeople from Gomel Region
Belarusian male long-distance runners
Russian male long-distance runners
Soviet male long-distance runners
Olympic athletes of the Soviet Union
Athletes (track and field) at the 1988 Summer Olympics
World Athletics Championships athletes for the Soviet Union
Goodwill Games medalists in athletics
Soviet Athletics Championships winners
Competitors at the 1990 Goodwill Games
Competitors at the 1986 Goodwill Games